Herman Frederik Bieling (21 June 1887, Rotterdam - 5 December 1964, Rhoon) was a Dutch painter, sculptor, graphic artist and Modern Art propagandist.

Bieling was a Dutch artist who worked in the Rotterdam area. He produced a large ouvre of paintings, sculpture and prints. HB was particularly noted for his use of "Bieling Blue" a vivid dark blue. In 1917 Bieling founded an artistic group called De Branding (The Surf or The Breakers in Dutch). Other members included Laurens van Kuik, Ger ladage (aka Gerwhl), Bernard Toon Gits, Jan Sirks and Wim Schmacher. Their aim was to exhibit and promote the new modern art in the Netherlands. They had many links with other art groups including De Stijl and Der Sturm. Bieling organized many modern art shows. These shows included paintings by himself and many modern artists including Otto Gleichmann, Kurt Schwitters, Constantin Brâncuși, and Piet Mondriaan.

Bieling's work was included in the 1939 exhibition and sale Onze Kunst van Heden (Our Art of Today) at the Rijksmuseum in Amsterdam.

List of Shows 
 1917 Leonard Hutton Galleries, NY ( with Kees van Dongen)
 1921 Rotterdamsche Kunstkring, Rotterdam
 1922 Kestneregesellschaft, Hannover
 1925 Kunstzaal Van Hasselt, Rotterdam
 1931 Rotterdamsche Kunstkring
 1936 Kunstzaal Van Lier, Amsterdam
 1955 Kunstatelier de Stroom, Rotterdam 
 1958 Haagse Kunstkring, Den Haag
 1967 Kuntstzaal Van Lier, Veere
 1968 Galerie De Sfinx, Amsterdam
 1975 Vrije University, Amsterdam
 1979 Kunsthandel Borzo, Den Bosch
 1988 Kunsthandel Smelik & Stokking, Denn Haag
 2003 Kasteel van Rhoon, Albrandswaard

References 

 "De Branding 1917- 1926" by Els Brinkman, Stichting Kunstpublicaties, Rotterdam 1991 
 "Herman Bieling" by Ed Wingen, Gemeente Allbrandswaard6, Netherlands 2003  -NUR 64

1887 births
1964 deaths
Painters from Rotterdam
20th-century Dutch painters
Dutch male painters
20th-century Dutch male artists